Chanos is a municipality located in the province of Zamora, Castile and León, Spain. According to the 2015 census (INE), the municipality has a population of 55 inhabitants.

Municipalities of the Province of Zamora